Pseudoanthidium is a genus of bees belonging to the family Megachilidae. The species of this genus are found in Eurasia, Africa and Australia.

Species

Pseudoanthidium acutum 
Pseudoanthidium alpinum 
Pseudoanthidium amoenum 
Pseudoanthidium arenosum 
Pseudoanthidium beaumonti 
Pseudoanthidium bicoloripenne 
Pseudoanthidium brachiatum 
Pseudoanthidium braunsi 
Pseudoanthidium bytinskii 
Pseudoanthidium campulodonta 
Pseudoanthidium canariense 
Pseudoanthidium cribratum 
Pseudoanthidium damaraense 
Pseudoanthidium deesense 
Pseudoanthidium enslini 
Pseudoanthidium eximium 
Pseudoanthidium flaviventre 
Pseudoanthidium guichardi 
Pseudoanthidium guillarmodi 
Pseudoanthidium haplogastrum 
Pseudoanthidium honestum 
Pseudoanthidium immaculatum 
Pseudoanthidium jocosum 
Pseudoanthidium junodi 
Pseudoanthidium katbergense 
Pseudoanthidium kryzhanovskii 
Pseudoanthidium lanificum 
Pseudoanthidium latitarse 
Pseudoanthidium ludingense 
Pseudoanthidium matjesfonteinense 
Pseudoanthidium melanurum 
Pseudoanthidium micronitens 
Pseudoanthidium micrurum 
Pseudoanthidium minutulum 
Pseudoanthidium mlanjense 
Pseudoanthidium nanum 
Pseudoanthidium nitidorubrum 
Pseudoanthidium obscuratum 
Pseudoanthidium ochrognathum 
Pseudoanthidium octodentatum 
Pseudoanthidium orientale 
Pseudoanthidium pictipes 
Pseudoanthidium piliventre 
Pseudoanthidium prionognathum 
Pseudoanthidium puncticolle 
Pseudoanthidium repetitum 
Pseudoanthidium reticulatum 
Pseudoanthidium rhombiferum 
Pseudoanthidium rotundiventre 
Pseudoanthidium sakaniense 
Pseudoanthidium scapulare 
Pseudoanthidium serratocaudatum 
Pseudoanthidium sjoestedti 
Pseudoanthidium soliferum 
Pseudoanthidium stigmaticorne 
Pseudoanthidium tanganyicola 
Pseudoanthidium tenellum 
Pseudoanthidium tergofasciatum 
Pseudoanthidium tertium 
Pseudoanthidium truncatum 
Pseudoanthidium tuberculiferum 
Pseudoanthidium variabile 
Pseudoanthidium wahrmanicum 
Pseudoanthidium xinjiangense

References

Megachilidae
Bee genera